Gary Merrington (born 19 November 1946) is a former Australian rules footballer who played with Footscray in the Victorian Football League (VFL).

Merrington was recruited locally, from Footscray District Football League club Braybrook, and also played on the alternate day for Sunshine YCW.

He played as a defender for most of his career, but also spent some time on the wing.

Merrington was a member of Footscray's 1967 and 1970 night premierships.

After retiring he continued serving the club as a recruiter and was their Football Manager during the 1990s.

He had two sons, Andrew Merrington, who played for Carlton and Adam who played in the Victorian Amateur Football Association for Old Essendon Grammarians.

References

1946 births
Australian rules footballers from Victoria (Australia)
Western Bulldogs players
Braybrook Football Club players
Living people